Brive-la-Gaillarde (Limousin dialect of ) is a commune of France. It is a sub-prefecture and the largest city of the Corrèze department. It has around 46,000 inhabitants, while the population of the agglomeration was 75,579 in 2019.

Although it is by far the biggest commune in Corrèze, the capital is Tulle. In French popular culture, the town is associated with a song by Georges Brassens.

History 
Even though the inhabitants settled around the 1st century, the city only started to grow much later. From around the 5th century onwards, the original city began to develop around a church dedicated to Saint-Martin-l'Espagnol. During the 12th century walls were built around the city and during the Hundred Years' War a second wall was built. These fortifications no longer exist and have been replaced by boulevards.

The commune was named "Brive" until 1919, when it was renamed "Brive-la-Gaillarde". The word "Gaillarde" (still used in current French) probably stands for bravery or strength in the city's name, but it can also refer to the city's walls. Brive now extends outside of its original boundaries into Malemort and Ussac.

During World War II, Brive-la-Gaillarde was a regional capital of the Resistance, acting as a seat of several clandestine information networks and several of the principal resistance movements, including the Armée secrète (or “Secret Army”) and the Mouvements Unis de la Résistance (or "United Movements of the Resistance").

Brive-la-Gaillarde was the first city of Occupied France to liberate itself by its own means, on 15 August 1944. For this, the city received the “Croix de guerre 1939–1945” military decoration.

The medieval centre is mainly a commercial district with retail shops and various cafés. It is also the location of the city hall, the main police station, and the Labenche museum. One notable landmark outside the inner city is the Pont Cardinal, a bridge which used to be a crossing point for travelers from Paris to Toulouse.

Climate

Administration 
The most recent mayors of Brive-la-Gaillarde were:
 1966–1995: Jean Charbonnel
 1995–2008: Bernard Murat
 2008–present: Philippe Nauche

Population

Transport 
Brive-la-Gaillarde railway station offers connections to Limoges, Périgueux, Bordeaux, Toulouse, and several regional destinations. The A20 motorway connects Brive with Limoges and Toulouse, the A89 with Bordeaux.

Brive–Souillac Airport lies south of the city. It was opened in 2010 to replace the older Brive-La Roche Airport.

Sport 
The city is home to a rugby union team, CA Brive. It also hosted the 2009 Junior World Rowing Championships.

Notable inhabitants 
 Guillaume Dubois (1656–1723), cardinal and statesman
 Pierre André Latreille (1762–1833), entomologist
 Jean-Baptiste Treilhard (born 3 January 1742 in Brive-la-Gaillarde – died December 1810 in Paris) was a French jurist and politician at the end of the 18th and the beginning of the 19th century.
 Nicolas Ernault des Bruslys, born on 7 August 1757 in Brive-la-Gaillarde and died on 25 September 1809 in Reunion, is a French general of the Revolution and the Empire.
 Guillaume Marie Anne Brune (1763–1815), marshal of France
 Michel Labrousse (1912–1988), scholar of Roman history
 David Feuerwerker (1912–1980) was a rabbi and professor of French Jewish history (Geneva, 2 October 1912 – Montreal, 20 June 1980).
 Antoinette Feuerwerker (1912–2003) Belgian lawyer and educator, wife of David Feuerwerker; Member of the Combat movement in Limousin alongside Edmond Michelet;
 Alceste De Ambris (born 15 September 1874 to Licciana Nardi, and died December 9, 1934, in Brive-la-Gaillard), an Italian politician and syndicalist;
 Robert Margerit (1910–1988), writer.
 Edmond Michelet (1899–1970), politician, leader of the Movement Combat Limousin; arrested by the Gestapo in Brive in February 1943; died in the village of Marcillac, the town of Brive;
 Patrick Sebastien (born 1953), imitator, actor, singer, television host.
 Xavier Patier (1958– ), civil servant and writer
 Cédric Villani (1973– ), mathematician; Fields Medalist in 2010
 Cédric Heymans (1978– ), French international rugby union player
 Dimitri Yachvili (1980– ), French international rugby union player
 Damian Penaud (1996– ), French international rugby union player
 Marine Serre (1991– ), French fashion designer
Michaud Clara (2005- )

Twin towns – sister cities

Brive-la-Gaillarde is twinned with:

 Guimarães, Portugal
 Joliette, Canada
 Lauf an der Pegnitz, Germany
 Melitopol, Ukraine
 Sikasso, Mali

See also 
Communes of the Corrèze department

References

External links 

 Official website 

Communes of Corrèze
Subprefectures in France
Lemovices
Limousin
Corrèze communes articles needing translation from French Wikipedia